The terms active packaging, intelligent packaging, and smart packaging refer to amplified packaging systems used with foods, pharmaceuticals, and several other types of products. They help extend shelf life, monitor freshness, display information on quality, improve safety, and improve convenience.

The terms are often related and can overlap. Active packaging usually means having active functions beyond the inert passive containment and protection of the product.    Intelligent and smart packaging usually involve the ability to sense or measure an attribute of the product, the inner atmosphere of the package, or the shipping environment.  This information can be communicated to users or can trigger active packaging functions.  Programmable matter, smart materials, etc. can be employed in packages.  Yam, Tashitov, and Miltz   have defined intelligent or smart packaging as: 

Depending on the working definitions, some traditional types of packaging might be considered as "active" or "intelligent".  More often, the terms are used with new technologically advanced systems: microelectronics, computer applications, nanotechnology, etc.

Moisture control

For many years, desiccants have been used to control the water vapor in a closed package.  A desiccant is a hygroscopic substance usually in a porous pouch or sachet which is placed inside a sealed package.  They have been used to reduce corrosion of machinery and electronics and to extend the shelf life of moisture-sensitive foods. With pharmaceutical packages, a common method is to include a small packet of desiccant in a bottle.  Other methods of including desiccants attached to the inner surface or in the material have recently been developed.

Corrosion
Corrosion inhibitors can be applied to items to help prevent rust and corrosion.  Volatile corrosion inhibitors (VCI) or vapor phase corrosion inhibitors can be provided inside a package in a pouch or can be incorporated in a saturated overwrap of special paper or plastic film. Many of these are organic salts that condense on the metal to resist corrosion. Some films also have VCI emitting capability.

Films are available with copper ions in the polymer structure,  These neutralize the corrosive gas in a package and deter rust.

VCIs create a neutral environment in the packaging. It works on the principle of difference in vapour pressure and causes reaction with metals and non-metals, and with moisture to prevent corrosion. There are different forms of VCIs available, such as papers, plastics, HDPE papers, oils, foams, chips, aluminum barrier foils, bubble, and emitters that can prevent corrosion at many stages.

Metal chelation 

Trace transition metals in foods, especially iron, can induce oxidative degradation of many food components, especially lipids, and cause quality changes of the products. Metal-chelating active packaging materials are made by immobilizing metal-chelating active compounds onto traditional active packaging material. The surface immobilized metal-chelating compounds can scavenge the transition metals from the product and enhance the oxidative stability of the product. The metal-chelating active packaging technology is also antioxidant active packaging that will extend the shelf-life of consumer products by controlling the oxidation. The metal-chelating active packaging technology is known to be able to remove synthetic food preservatives (e.g. EDTA) from the food product. This technology can be used to address the increasing consumer demand for additive free and 'clean' label food products.

Oxygen control

Oxygen scavengers or oxygen absorbers help remove oxygen from a closed package.  Some are small packets or sachets containing powdered iron: as the iron rusts, oxygen is removed from the surrounding atmosphere.  Newer systems are on cards or can be built into package films or molded structures.
In addition, the physical characteristics of the packaging itself (oxygen transmission rate - OTR) can dictate how effective an oxygen absorber can be, and how long it will stay effective. Packaging with a low OTR will let less oxygen in the closed package through the polymer barrier itself.

Atmosphere

With some products, such as cheese, it has long been common to flush the package with nitrogen prior to sealing: the inert nitrogen is absorbed into the cheese, allowing a tight shrink film package. The nitrogen removes oxygen and interacts with the cheese to make the package functional.

More recently, other mixtures of gas have been used inside the package to extend the shelf life.  The gas mixture depends on the specific product and its degradation mechanisms.  Some package components have been developed that incorporate active chemistry to help maintain certain atmospheres in packages.

Oxygen scavengers, carbon dioxide generators, ethanol generators, etc. are available to help keep the atmosphere in a package at specified conditions.

Temperature monitor
Some temperature indicators give a visual signal that a specified temperature has been exceeded.  Others, Time temperature indicators, signal when a critical accumulation of temperature deviation over time has been exceeded.  When the mechanism of the indicator is tuned to the mechanism of product degradation, these can provide valuable signals for consumers.

Digital temperature data loggers record the temperatures encountered throughout the shipment.  This data can be used to predict product degradation and help determine if the product is suited for normal sale or if expedited sale is required.  They also determine the time of the temperature excess: this can be used to direct corrective action.

Thermochromic inks are sometimes used to signal temperature excess or change.  Some are reversible while others have a permanent change of color. These can be used alone or with other packaging functions such as barcodes.

The inks can also signal a desired temperature for consumers.  For example, one type of beer can has ink that graphically shows when an ideal drinking temperature is achieved.

Controlling package temperatures

For critical vaccines, insulated shipping containers are passive packaging to help control the temperatures fluctuations seen even with a controlled cold chain.  In addition, gel packs are often used to keep the temperature of the contents within specified acceptable temperature ranges.

Some newer packages have the ability to heat or cool the product for the consumer.  These have segregated compartments where exothermic or endothermic reactions provide the desired effect.
Self-heating cans are available for several products.

Dispensing

Some packages have closures or other dispensing systems that change the contents from a liquid to an aerosol.  These are used for products ranging from precision inhalers for medications to spray bottles of household cleaners.

Some dispensing packages for two-part epoxy adhesives do more than passively contain the two components.  When dispensed, some packages meter and mix the two components so the adhesive is fully functioning at the point of application.

The ability of a package to fully empty or dispense a viscous liquid is somewhat dependent on the  surface energy of the inner walls of the container.  The use of superhydrophobic surfaces is useful but can be further  improved  by using new lubricant-impregnated surfaces.

RFID

Radio-frequency identification chips are becoming more common with the introduction of smart labels that are used to track and trace packages and unit loads throughout distribution.  Newer developments include recording the temperature history of shipments and other intelligent packaging functions.
RFID can be integrated into labels: Smart labels.

Security
A variety of security printing methods, security holograms, and specialized labels are available to help confirm that the product in the package is not counterfeit.  RFID chips are being used in this application also.

Electronic article surveillance (on the product or on the package) is used to help counter shoplifting.

Microwave packaging
Metallised films are used as a susceptor for cooking in microwave ovens. These increase the heating capacity and help make foods crisp and brown. Plastic microwavable containers are also used for microwave cooking.

Shock and vibration
Shock detectors have been available for many years.  These are attached to the package or to the product in the package to determine if an excessive shock has been encountered.  The mechanisms of these shock overload devices have been spring-mass systems, magnets, drops of red dDye, and several others.

Recently, digital shock and vibration data loggers have been available to more accurately record the shocks and vibrations of shipment.  These are used to monitor critical shipments to determine if extra inspection and calibration is required.  They are also used to monitor the types of shocks and vibrations encountered in transit for use in package testing in a laboratory.

Antimicrobial control

Some engineered packaging films contain enzymes, antimicrobial agents, scavengers, natural pigments and other active components to help control food degradation and extend shelf life and safety. 
The mechanism focuses on preventing the growth of pathogenic or spoilage microorganisms.

Bar Codes 
Bar codes have long been used with packaging to identify an item, facilitate routing, communicate locations, etc.  there are many varietuies of linear bar codes.  Some are stacked to provide more information.  Two dimensional Matrix codes can have a higher information density. 

QR Codes can be used on packaging to provide additional information on the product via a smartphone scan. With digital printers, unit-level QR Codes can become the equivalent of a unique identifier or URL for each packaging, and enable other interactions with consumers  such as providing specific information on product traceability, or deploying loyalty programs.    Unit-level QR Codes  are easy to counterfeit if additional security features are not used, but the scan data generated can be used for active brand protection. A digital watermark or secure graphic can be inserted into the QR Code to  make it copy-sensitive and let consumers authenticate  products with a higher security level.

The GS1 digital link is a standard for embedding GS1 standardised product identifiers into the unique identifier, which allows the same QR Code (or other data carrier) to provide information to  consumers, retailers and supply chain.

Printed codes can be combined with security printing for expanded uses.  For example thermochromic ink can be used to activate, change,  or deactivate a code based on the item’s temperature history.

Other developments

Edible films have been developed to allow consumers to eat the package along with the product.

Packaging materials including silver nanoparticles have been shown to extend the shelflife of some foods.

Special packaging has been developed for shipping organs which keeps them alive during extended shipments.  The organs are alive and fresh for transplanting.

Several packages used by Canadian cannabis corporations use active packaging to monitor THC levels throughout the production process. This is being implemented in order to ensure consistency between products to improve supply chain management as well as offer consumers improved value of purchase.

Regulations

Active packaging is often designed to interact with the contents of the package.  Thus extra care is often needed for active or smart packagings that are food contact materials.

Food packagers take extra care with some types of active packaging.  For example, when the oxygen atmosphere in a package is reduced for extending shelf life, controls for anaerobic bacteria need to be considered. Also when a controlled atmosphere reduces the appearance of food degradation, consumers need to retain a means of determining whether actual degradation is present.

See also
 Automatic identification and data capture
 Electronic article surveillance
 Scavenger (chemistry)
 Security printing
 Self-heating food packaging
 Smart material

References

Further reading 

 Yam, K. L., "Encyclopedia of Packaging Technology", John Wiley & Sons, 2009, 
 Brody, A. L., "Active Packaging for Food Applications", CRC Press, 2001
 Kerry, J, and Butler, P, "Smart Packaging Technologies for Fast Moving Consumer Goods", Wiley, 
 Sabotka, I.; Junge, S.; Mandel, A.; Seibt, M.: "Smart Packaging - Intelligente Verpackung mit Mehrwert", in: Henning, J. (Publ.): "Verpackungstechnik", Beuth Verlag Berlin/Germany, 2014, 

Food preservation
Packaging